Reason: Why Liberals Will Win the Battle for America is a book written by former Bill Clinton administration Secretary of Labor, Robert Reich.

Reviews
 "REASON: Why Liberals Will Win the Battle for America", by Robert B. Reich. Publishers Weekly, May 12, 2010
 "BOOKS OF THE TIMES; What's Right and What's Left To Say on the Political Divide", by Ted Widmer, July 7, 2004
 "Reason: Why Liberals Will Win the Battle for America", Carnegie Council, Public Affairs Program, with Robert B. Reich, Joanne J. Myers, May 19, 2004 (Lecture and Q&A with Reich discussing his book)

2004 non-fiction books
American political books